Dúnchad Muirisci mac Tipraite (died 683) was a King of Connacht from the Ui Fiachrach branch of the Connachta. He was of the Ui Fiachrach Muaidhe sept based along the River Moy. This line was descended from Fiachnae, a brother of Ailill Molt (died 484).  

His epithet shows that he won control of the Muiresc region on the Moy and his line provided the later kings of Ui Fiachrach. Both the king-lists and the annals attest to his rule as king in the years 682–683. However they give his father as Máeldub whereas genealogies such as the Book of Ballymote name Máeldub as his grandfather and Tipraite as his father. 

The annals record that he was killed in 683 but do not mention who was responsible. His known sons were Indrechtach mac Dúnchado (died 707), a king of Connacht, and Aillil.

Notes

See also
Kings of Connacht

References

 Annals of Tigernach
 Francis J.Byrne, Irish Kings and High-Kings 
 Book of Leinster,Section 30
 Laud Synchronisms
 The Chronology of the Irish Annals, Daniel P. McCarthy

External links
CELT: Corpus of Electronic Texts at University College Cork

683 deaths
Kings of Connacht
Monarchs from County Mayo
People from County Sligo
7th-century Irish monarchs
Gaels
Year of birth unknown 
Year of death unknown 
7th-century births
7th-century deaths